Becker–Westfall House, also known as Westfall House, is a historic home and tavern located at Schoharie in Schoharie County, New York, United States. It is a brick structure built in 1784, with a two-story, three-bay rectangular block and a one-story, three-bay wing.  Also on the property is a brick smoke house, garage, barn, and a cow stable.

The house was added to the National Register of Historic Places in 1979.

References

Houses on the National Register of Historic Places in New York (state)
Houses completed in 1784
Houses in Schoharie County, New York
National Register of Historic Places in Schoharie County, New York